Parasiccia is a genus of moths in the subfamily Arctiinae.

Type species: Parasiccia maculifascia (Moore, 1878)

Species
Some species of this genus are:

Parasiccia abraxina  Rothschild 1913
Parasiccia atroalba  Strand 1922
Parasiccia atrosuffusa Strand 1922 
Parasiccia chinensis Daniel 1951 
Parasiccia coreana   Bryk 1948
Parasiccia dentata  Wileman 1911
Parasiccia formosibia Strand 1917 
Parasiccia fuscipennis Hampson 1914 
Parasiccia maculata  (Poujade 1886)
Parasiccia maculifascia (Moore, 1878) 
Parasiccia marginipuncta  (Talbot, 1926)
Parasiccia mokanshanensis  Reich 1957 
Parasiccia nebulosa Wileman 1914 
Parasiccia nocturna Hampson 1900 
Parasiccia ochrorubens (Mabille, 1900)
Parasiccia perirrorata Hampson 1903 
Parasiccia punctatissima ( Poujade 1886) 
Parasiccia punctilinea Wileman, 1911 
Parasiccia shirakii Matsumura 1930

Former species
Parasiccia altaica (Lederer 1855)
Parasiccia fasciata (Butler 1877)

References
Ubio.org
Natural History Museum Lepidoptera generic names catalog

Lithosiini